General elections were held in Azad Kashmir on 11 July 2006 to elect the members of eighth assembly of Azad Kashmir. Sardar Attique Ahmed Khan and Raja Zulqarnain Khan were respectively elected as Prime Minister and President of Azad Kashmir. The All Jammu and Kashmir Muslim Conference won 20 out of 41 seats.

Controversies
Candidates from the Jammu Kashmir Liberation Front and other pro-independence groups were not allowed to run; local law prohibits persons expressing views counter to "the ideology of Pakistan, the ideology of the State’s accession to Pakistan or the sovereignty, integrity of Pakistan" from running for office. Opposition groups saw the vote as rigged in favour of the Pakistani federal government.

References

Elections in Azad Kashmir
Azad
July 2006 events in Pakistan